Amalric or Amalaric (also Americ, Almerich, Emeric, Emerick and other variations) is a personal name derived from the tribal name Amal (referring to the Gothic Amali) and ric (Gothic reiks) meaning "ruler, prince". 

Equivalents in different languages include:
French: Amaury (surname/given name), Amalric (surname), Amaurich (surname), Maury (surname)
German: Amalrich, Emmerich
Italian: Amerigo, Arrigo
Hungarian: Imre
Latin: Amalricus, Americus, Almericus, Emericus
Greek: Emerikos
Polish: Amalaryk, Amalryk, Emeryk
Dutch: Emmerik, Amerik, Hamelink, Hamelryck
Portuguese: Amauri, Américo, América
Spanish: Américo
Serbo-Croatian: Emerik

Given name
 Amalaric (502–531), King of the Visigoths from 526 to 531
 Malaric (fl. 585), King of the Suevi
Amaury, Count of Valenciennes (fl.953-973)
 Amalric of Nesle (fl. 1151–1180), Patriarch of Jerusalem from 1158 to 1180
 Amalric I of Jerusalem (1136–1174), King of Jerusalem from 1162 to 1174
 Amalric II of Jerusalem (fl. 1155–1205), King of Jerusalem from 1197 to 1205
 Amalric of Bena (f. 1200–1204), French theologian
 Arnaud Amalric (fl. 1196–1225), seventeenth abbot of Citeaux
 Amaury de Montfort (disambiguation), several individuals including:
 Amaury de Montfort (died 1241) (1195–1241), crusader
 Amalric, Lord of Tyre (c. 1272 – 1310), Governor of Cyprus from 1306 to 1310
 Amerigo Vespucci (1451-1512),  Italian merchant, explorer, and navigator from the Republic of Florence, from whose name the term "America" is derived.

Surname
 Arnaud Amalric (died 1225), Cistercian abbot 
 Mathieu Amalric (born 1965), French actor and director
 Leonid Amalrik (1905–1997), Soviet animator
 Andrei Amalrik (1938–1980), Soviet dissident

See also
 Amaury (disambiguation), a French alternative spelling
 Emery (name)

Masculine given names